Thomas Tanner (1830 – 22 July 1918) was a 19th-century Member of Parliament in New Zealand.

Born in Wiltshire, England, in 1830, Tanner arrived in New Zealand in 1850, and took up a large farm in Hawke's Bay in 1853.

Tanner was a member of the Hawke's Bay Provincial Council from 1867 to 1875. He represented the Hawkes Bay parliamentary electorate of Waipawa from 1887 to 1890, when he retired and William Cowper Smith was re-elected to the seat; Smith had held Waipawa until 1887, when he was elected for the new electorate of Woodville (which only existed from 1887 to 1890).

He died at Havelock North on 22 July 1918.

References

1830 births
1918 deaths
Members of the New Zealand House of Representatives
Unsuccessful candidates in the 1884 New Zealand general election
New Zealand MPs for North Island electorates
People from Wiltshire
English emigrants to New Zealand
Members of the Hawke's Bay Provincial Council
Unsuccessful candidates in the 1893 New Zealand general election
19th-century New Zealand politicians